Templo de Nuestra Señora del Carmen is a church in Centro, Guadalajara, in the Mexican state of Jalisco. The building, whose construction began in 1690, is considered an example of neoclassical architecture following a 19th-century renovation that resulted from the widening of the avenue on which it's located.

The church's feast day is celebrated on July 16.

References

External links
 

Buildings and structures in Guadalajara, Jalisco
Churches in Mexico
Centro, Guadalajara